The 1979 Kwara State gubernatorial election occurred on July 28, 1979. NPN candidate Adamu Atta won the election.

Results
Adamu Atta representing NPN won the election. The election held on July 28, 1979.

References 

Kwara State gubernatorial elections
Kwara State gubernatorial election
Kwara State gubernatorial election